The 2003 World Junior Wrestling Championships were the 28th edition of the World Junior Wrestling Championships and were held in Istanbul, Turkey between 25 and 31 August 2003.

Medal table

Medal summary

Men's freestyle

Greco-Roman

Women's freestyle

References

External links 
 UWW Database

World Junior Championships
Wrestling Championships
International wrestling competitions hosted by Turkey
World Junior Wrestling Championships
Sports competitions in Istanbul